Jill M. Hooley is a professor of psychology at Harvard University. She is currently the head of the experimental psychopathology and clinical psychology program at Harvard. In 2009, she was the president of the Society for Research in Psychopathology.

History 
Hooley was born in England, she studied a B.Sc. in psychology from the University of Liverpool, She also attended Magdalen College, Oxford, from there she completed her D.Phil. Hooley has been a faculty member since 1985.

Research/awards 
In 2000, H...Received Award for Excellence in Psychopathology Research and 2015, she was recipient of the Joseph Zubin Award for Lifetime Achievement in Psychopathology Research from the Society for Research in Psychopathology.

Books

Publications 
Predictors of relapse in unipolar depressives: expressed emotion, marital distress, and perceived criticism
 
 
 Attributions and expressed emotion: A review
 Expressed emotion: A review of the critical literature

References 

Alumni of the University of Liverpool
Alumni of Magdalen College, Oxford
British women psychologists
English psychologists
English expatriates in the United States
Harvard University faculty
Year of birth missing (living people)
Living people